Contract with God may refer to:

A covenant with God
 A Contract with God, a graphic novel by Will Eisner
 Contract with God, UK title for a novel by Juan Gómez-Jurado published in the U.S. as The Moses Expedition